Zgornji Čačič is a small settlement in the Municipality of Osilnica in southern Slovenia. It is part of the traditional region of Lower Carniola and is now included in the Southeast Slovenia Statistical Region.

References

External links
Zgornji Čačič on Geopedia

Populated places in the Municipality of Osilnica